Wężerów  is a village in the administrative district of Gmina Słomniki, within Kraków County, Lesser Poland Voivodeship, in southern Poland.

Despite being a village, it has no inhabitants but some few goers now and then.
The village was housed a Nazi headquarters during WW2. It was captured and burned down by advancing Soviet forces in 1945.

References

Villages in Kraków County